Coleophora eremodes is a moth of the family Coleophoridae. It is found in South Africa.

References

Endemic moths of South Africa
eremodes
Moths described in 1912
Moths of Africa